Nesidiochernes is a genus of pseudoscorpions in the subfamily Chernetinae.

References

External links 
 
 

Chernetidae
Pseudoscorpion genera